Poplar Hill is a historic home located at Aberdeen, Harford County, Maryland.  It is a -story, gambrel-roofed frame house, built in the mid-18th century. A late-19th-century one-bay, two-story, gable-roofed wing is attached.

Poplar Hill was listed on the National Register of Historic Places in 1976.

References

External links
, including undated photo, Maryland Historical Trust

Houses in Harford County, Maryland
Houses on the National Register of Historic Places in Maryland
Houses completed in 1750
Aberdeen, Maryland
National Register of Historic Places in Harford County, Maryland